Tómas Rodríguez (born 1 April 1962) is a Panamanian weightlifter. He competed at the 1984 Summer Olympics and the 1988 Summer Olympics.

References

1962 births
Living people
Panamanian male weightlifters
Olympic weightlifters of Panama
Weightlifters at the 1984 Summer Olympics
Weightlifters at the 1988 Summer Olympics
Central American and Caribbean Games medalists in weightlifting
Place of birth missing (living people)
20th-century Panamanian people
21st-century Panamanian people